was a sub-unit of the Japanese idol girl groups Morning Musume and Coconuts Musume. It was formed by Up-Front Promotion in 2000 and associated with Hello! Project. The group was founded by Morning Musume members Mari Yaguchi, Nozomi Tsuji, and Ai Kago, with Coconuts Musume member Mika later added as a member. After Yaguchi's departure in 2002, Morning Musume member Ai Takahashi was added into the group.

Throughout their career, Mini-Moni appeared in media aimed at children, having two animated series from 2001 to 2002, variety shows, as well as a 2002 film based on their stage personas titled Mini-Moni the Movie: Okashi na Daibōken!. In addition to that, they also appeared in several Hamtaro movies, performing the theme songs under the name .

The group later disbanded in 2004, after Todd left Hello! Project and Tsuji and Kago left Morning Musume to debut in W. In 2009, Mini-Moni was revived as a Hello! Project Shuffle Unit and concert-only unit under the name Shin Mini-Moni; the group had new members and remained active until 2011.

History

2000–2004: Formation
The group was founded in late 2000 by Morning Musume member Mari Yaguchi, with the concept of having members  and shorter. Together with Morning Musume's songwriter and producer, Tsunku, she selected two new members, Ai Kago and Nozomi Tsuji and the trio began performing in concerts as Mini-Moni. Mika Todd from Coconuts Musume was later added to the group. They made their official CD debut with "Mini-Moni Jankenpyon! / Haru Natsu Aki Fuyu Daisukki!" in 2001, which became a #1 hit.

The quartet released several singles in 2001 and 2002, with most of these tracks compiled on their first album Mini-Moni Song Daihyakka Ikkan. Simultaneous to their single releases, the band became the subject of a series of short cartoons, Mini-Moni Yaru no da Pyon!, voicing their own characters. They also contributed their voices to a string of movies based on the Hamtaro cartoon series, which featured a hamster version of Mini-Moni known as Mini-Hamus.

In 2002, Yaguchi graduated from Mini-Moni to take on the leadership of the subgroup ZYX. Ai Takahashi was added as a member, while Mika Todd, took over Yaguchi's place as the band's leader. That same year, all members of Mini-Moni starred in the film Mini-Moni the Movie: Okashi na Daibōken!, a fictional account explaining the change in members.

Afterwards, Mini-Moni released "Crazy About You" and later the album Mini-Moni Songs 2. They also starred in a mini-series called Mini-Moni de Bremen no Ongakutai starring Takahashi, Tsuji, and Kago; Mika Todd made brief appearances in two episodes. The group disbanded in May 2004 at Mika Todd's graduation concert, following the release of a final single, "Lucky Cha Cha Cha!"

2018: 20th anniversary reunion

On February 12, 2018, TV Tokyo aired a television special celebrating Mini-Moni's 20th anniversary. Yaguchi and Tsuji made an appearance and performed "Mini-Moni Jankenpyon!" with Morning Musume '18 members Ayumi Ishida and Reina Yokoyama.

Members

 Mari Yaguchi (2000-2003)
 Nozomi Tsuji (2000-2004)
 Ai Kago (2000-2004)
 Mika Todd (2000-2004)
 Ai Takahashi (2003-2004)

Legacy

In June 2007, an excerpt from a November 2000 episode of Mini-Moni Chiccha (their segment on Hello! Morning) of a prairie dog suddenly turning his head became the basis for the Internet phenomenon the Dramatic Chipmunk. A parody of the Dramatic Chipmunk clip, including lookalikes of Mini-Moni, appears in Weezer's music video for their 2008 single "Pork and Beans".

Shin Mini-Moni

On May 26, 2009, Yaguchi posted on her blog discussing how the head producer of Hello! Project, Tsunku, had contacted her asking for permission to bring the group out of hiatus. Tsunku confirmed on his own blog that Mini-Moni would be revived as a Hello! Project Shuffle Unit with an entirely new line-up, announcing then-Smileage member Kanon Fukuda as the first member. He later announced then-Morning Musume member Linlin as the group's leader, with then-Hello Pro Egg trainees Akari Takeuchi and Karin Miyamoto as the final two members. Project's compilation albums Champloo 1: Happy Marriage Song Cover Shū and Petit Best 10. The group was also active as a concert-only unit until 2011.

Discography

Studio albums

Singles

Soundtrack appearances

Filmography

Television

Films

Video games
Mini-Moni: Dice de Pyon! 	(Konami, March 20, 2002, PlayStation)
Mini-Moni ni Naru no da Pyon! (Bandai, September 26, 2002, PlayStation)
Mini-Moni: Shaka tto Tambourine! Dapyon! (Sega, September 19, 2002, PlayStation)
Mini-Moni: Step Up Pyon Pyon Pyon (Konami, December 12, 2002, PlayStation)
Mini-Moni HapiMoni: Mika no Happy Morning chatty (Shogakukan, Game Boy Advance)
Mini-Moni: Onegai Ohoshi-sama (Game Boy Advance)

Notes

References

External links 
Official discography on the Up-Front Works site 

Japanese pop music groups
Japanese girl groups
Musical groups established in 2000
Japanese idol groups
Hello! Project groups
Minimoni
Musical groups from Tokyo
Video games based on musicians
Band-centric video games
Video games based on real people